Hannu Kottonen (born 13 June 1957) is a Finnish orienteering competitor. He received a silver medal in the relay event at the 1979 World Orienteering Championships in Tampere, and a bronze medal in the relay in 1981.

See also
 Finnish orienteers
 List of orienteers
 List of orienteering events

References

1957 births
Living people
Finnish orienteers
Male orienteers
Foot orienteers
World Orienteering Championships medalists